Ostroff may refer to:

Aviva Armour-Ostroff, Canadian actress, writer and filmmaker
Dawn Ostroff, Chief Content Officer at Spotify
Eugene Ostroff (1928–1999), American Historian
Stephen Ostroff, acting commissioner of the US Food and Drug Administration from 2015 to 2016
Ostroff, a terrorist in the American television series 24